Animal Kingdom Foundation or simply AKF, is a non-profit animal welfare non-governmental organization based in the Philippines. Founded in 2002, it is committed to "improving the living and welfare conditions of animals", eliminating the trade of dog meat for human consumption, and advocating for the improvement of animal living conditions.

History 
Animal Kingdom Foundation was founded in 2002 by Charles Leslie Wartenberg, driven by his love for animals and after learning about the dog meat trade in the Philippines and how commonly practiced it is in the provinces. Troubled by this act, he arranged a team that would attempt to save the dogs from slaughter and make the perpetrators liable for their acts. Due to its prevalence in the country, numerous raids and interceptions have been conducted in various locations, saving thousands of dogs' lives.

AKF envisions a Philippine nation that is compassionate, responsible, respectful, and loving towards animals as it spearheads a passionate and dedicated animal welfare campaign resulting in every individual recognizing animals as sentient beings while embracing the tenet that compassion towards every animal is our own sole responsibility.

To provide shelter for the rescued dogs, AKF put up a rescue and rehabilitation center in Capas, Tarlac. Here, the dog's medical needs are treated and rehabilitated until they're ready to be adopted by its new family. They are working and campaigning not only for the welfare and protection of companion animals but of farm animals as well.

Apart from AKF's campaign for companion animals, the organization is also driven to improve the quality of life that egg-laying hens have throughout their laying period. This is carried out by encouraging the use of cage-free eggs in the consumers' meals and by educating egg farmers about its difference from the conventional battery cage egg farm setup used by most egg farmers.

Campaigns and programs

Ending the dog meat trade 
The dog meat trade is one of the most serious animal welfare concerns in the Philippines.  The availability and consumption of dog meat are widespread in various parts of the country where the welfare concern lies in the large number of dogs that are taken from the streets and slaughtered. AKF has organized rescues, conducted rehabilitation, and provided rescued dogs shelters as soon as the dogs are ready and have completely recovered. It has also pursued the prosecution of dog meat traders and conducts its own surveillance, stake-outs, and raids in full coordination with the Philippine National Police in order to end this practice.

Alongside the Philippine National Police, AKF has also partnered with the Bureau of Animal Industry's – Animal Welfare Division, and National Meat Inspection Service in the implementation of the laws against animal cruelty and, most notably, against the dog meat trade.

Cage-Free, Go Cruel-Free! 
The Cage-free, Go Cruel-Free! is a campaign calling for the improvement of the egg-laying hens' living conditions as part of the response to the rising global awareness of consumers to the practices that take place in the farm before their food reaches the market. AKF claims that in a cage-free environment, the egg-laying hens can stretch their wings, run around, and exhibit their natural behaviors which are all vital to them.

Education, Adoption, and Care 
Gearing towards the organization's vision of a Philippine nation that is compassionate, responsible, respectful, and loving towards animals, AKF's PEP (Pet Education Program) Squad reaches out to different schools, barangays, and universities to educate the youth about responsible pet ownership, animal welfare, rabies and bite prevention, and more.

AKF puts its rescued animals up for adoption upon their full recovery and rehabilitation. These animals are also spayed or neutered with complete vaccines to prepare them for their new owners. The adopters undergo screening to ensure that the adopted animal will be given proper care. Animal lovers who are willing to adopt, but have no capacity to do so, can choose to sponsor a rescued animal from AKF. Sponsoring a rescued dog will help raise funds for its food, medicine, and housing while they wait for its eventual adoption.

The animals under the foundation's care are managed by various volunteer teams;
 Dog rehoming team - scouts for a potential dog adopter and assists in the process until the dogs are finally rehomed.
 Kenneling & Socialization - take part in feeding, bathing, grooming, maintenance of the kennels, dog walking, and more as part of the dogs' rehabilitation.
 Veterinary Care - attends to health checks on kennel rounds, facilitates diagnosis and treatment including vaccination and lab works, helps in the quarantine process and rehabilitation of newly rescued dogs, and participates in AKF-organized veterinary missions.

Project SNAP 
Animal Kingdom Foundation's Spay, Neuter, and Adopt Program with veterinary services embodies the organization's mission of making veterinary care more accessible to underprivileged pet owners. AKF believes that Project SNAP offers a solution to dog and cat overpopulation. This collaboration with other agencies and groups is held in various communities that need animal care.

CLAWS 
AKF has worked, through its CLAWS team, with various government agencies, organizations, and stakeholders in crafting and amending laws that aim to safeguard the welfare of animals making for a more animal-friendly environment.

Its CLAWS team also provides free legal assistance for animal-related cases, lobby for more comprehensive rules and laws for the animals, and give consultations on animal welfare concerns.

Disaster Response 
AKF has initiated quick responses during the Mayon and Taal volcano eruptions, flooding, typhoons, and other natural disasters by providing veterinary attention, and feeding and rescue of the affected animals while also providing immediate shelter to the surviving dogs.

"Voluntourist" program 
Combining volunteering and sightseeing, "Voluntourism" according to the AKF is a new form of travel that allows tourists, to contribute to sustainable development while also exploring new places and cultures. AKF says that adventure seekers find that doing volunteer work while on vacation is the best way to experience the best of both worlds.

We Feed as One 
"We Feed as One" was initiated after the COVID-19 pandemic forced the Philippine government to institute a lockdown. The "We Feed As One" initiative was created to find ways to go out and feed the strays, source out animal food, and help struggling shelters.

Facilities

AKF Rescue and Rehabilitation Center 
The AKF Rescue and Rehabilitation Center is located in Capas, Tarlac where it serves as a sanctuary for more than 100 rescued dogs. Here, the rescued dogs get to play around with other dogs and bond with humans as part of their rehabilitation. The AKF shelter is also home to animals such as cats, goats, pigs, and cage-free egg-laying hens.

Clinic
Apart from tending to the needs of the organization's rescued dogs, AKF's low-cost clinic is also open to the public for veterinary services (e.g. veterinary consultation, hospitalization, grooming and hygiene, and vaccine & immunization).

References

External links 
 AKF Website
 AKF Frequently Asked Questions
 AKF Facebook Page
 AKF Twitter Account
 AKF Instagram Account

Animal welfare organizations based in the Philippines
Animal charities
Animal sanctuaries
Dog welfare organizations
Animal rescue groups